Rafael Viñoly Beceiro (1 June 1944 – 2 March 2023) was an Uruguayan-born  architect based in New York. He was the principal of Rafael Viñoly Architects, which he founded in 1983. The firm has offices in New York City, Palo Alto, London, Manchester, Abu Dhabi, and Buenos Aires. Viñoly designed landmark buildings internationally.

Viñoly rose to international prominence with his Tokyo International Forum. Reviewing the Museum of Modern Art's exhibition of models and drawings for the building while it was still under construction, the then New York Times architecture critic Herbert Muschamp hailed Vinoly's design as "a monument to the idea of openness" that "revives faith in architecture as an instrument of intellectual clarity".

Early life
Viñoly was born in Montevideo, Uruguay, on 1 June 1944, to Román Viñoly Barreto, a film and theater director, and Maria Beceiro, a math teacher. "It was a cultivated household where the architecture of Le Corbusier, the art of translation, or the conducting of Arturo Toscanini might form part of the table talk," wrote Louis Jebb, in The Art Newspaper. "The family moved to Buenos Aires when Rafael was five years old, after his father was invited to the city to direct Wagner's music drama Die Walküre at the city's Teatro Colón. Viñoly attended the University of Buenos Aires, receiving a Diploma in Architecture (1968) and a Master of Architecture (1969) from the Faculty of Architecture and Urbanism.

Career
In 1964, he formed the "Estudio de Arquitectura Manteola-Petchersky-Sánchez Gómez-Santos-Solsona-Viñoly" architectural firm in Buenos Aires with six associates (Flora Manteola, Ignacio Petchersky, Javier Sánchez Gómez, Josefina Santos, and Justo Solsona). This practice, which came to be known as M/SG/S/S/S, or MSGSSS, would go on to become one of the largest architectural practices in South America, completing many significant commissions in a very short time.

In 1978, Viñoly and his family relocated to the United States. For a brief period, he served as a guest lecturer at the Harvard Graduate School of Design. In 1979, he settled permanently in New York City where, in 1983, he founded the firm Rafael Viñoly Architects PC. His first major project in New York was the John Jay College of Criminal Justice, completed in 1988. In 1989, he won an international competition to design the Tokyo International Forum, which was completed in 1996. His firm's design was one of the finalists in the World Trade Center design competition.

During the course of his 40-plus year career, Viñoly practiced in the United States, Latin America, Europe, Asia, Africa, and the Middle East.

Viñoly earned a reputation as "a serene functionalist and a master of institutional design", as an unbylined article in Metropolis put it, noting that  "schools, civic buildings, convention centers, and the like have long been the mainstay of Viñoly's practice." "I'm very interested in unglamorousness!" he said, in the same article. "People don't understand how important this kind of thing" – the human use of buildings, as opposed to architecture as monumental sculpture – "is. If you remember, 10, 15 years ago, if you weren't working on a museum you weren't an architect. With hospitals, that level of snobbism would never have been applicable—nobody gives a royal screw about that stuff". John Gravois, writing in the UAE National News, applauded Viñoly's "affinity for the nerdy, workmanlike challenges of designing complex institutional architecture: hospitals, a nanosystems institute, a cancer research center. His buildings often seem designed not to be photographed from the air but to be used and experienced – from both the inside and out. And he displays the distinctly unstar-like habit of designing structures that respect their neighbors." As well, Gravois observed, he deplores "the insidiousness of contemporary architectural culture", singling out for criticism buildings "that tend to do only one thing, which is to create the sense of fame".

Viñoly was a Fellow of the American Institute of Architects, an International Fellow of the Royal Institute of British Architects, and a member of the Japan Institute of Architects and the Argentinian Sociedad Central de Arquitectos.

Personal life
Viñoly was married to interior designer Diana Viñoly. Their son, Román, is the director of Rafael Viñoly Architects. Viñoly also had two stepsons, Nicolas and Lucas Michael.

The family lived in multiple locations: Tribeca, New York; Water Mill, Long Island (where Viñoly built a piano house for one of his collection of nine concert grand pianos); and London.

He also "remained connected to his home country, spending summers in Montevideo, and designing there as well," wrote Elizabeth Fazzare, in an obituary for Architectural Digest. "One of his most handsome recent projects is the Laguna Garzón Bridge, a circular road deck and pedestrian walkway whose design allows an eco-friendly crossing over the environmentally sensitive 4,448-acre lagoon on the nation's coast."

Fazzare, who worked for Viñoly's firm from 2015 to 2017, recalled his quirky style, which may or may not have been a subtle form of personal branding. "With four pairs of glasses often strung around his neck (each with a specific purpose, he once told me...) and dressed in his uniform of an all-black suit with a black T-shirt, he was easily recognized in a crowd. But it was the cheeky smile he wore during frequent sharp-witted jokes delivered in that nonchalant manner that charmed so many."

Death and legacy 

Viñoly died from an aneurysm in New York City on 2 March 2023. He was 78.

New York magazine's Curbed site remembered Viñoly in its obituary as "prolific and polarizing", the quintessential New York architect, committed to the "'relatively small, rocky island,' as he once called it, 'with this urban experiment, which is so unique and irreproducible.'" Noting the "astonishing" number of major projects he "left scattered across that island and its adjacent territories", most memorably the controversial supertall, super-skinny Midtown condo building (its width-to-height ratio is 1:16) at 432 Park Avenue, the design critic Ian Volner observed, "Anyone so frantically prolific was bound to run into the clothesline of public opinion at some point." Ticking off Viñoly's most problem-plagued buildings—his 20 Fenchurch Street tower in London and his Vdara resort complex in Las Vegas, whose glazed façades turned reflected sunlight into a blistering "death ray"—Volner suggested that his "attraction to ideas like transparency and simplicity trumped other, more quotidian considerations". Nonetheless, he applauded the architect's "commitment to making a more beautiful, more functional New York," singling out the elegant front of his athletics facility for Lehman College ("a nautiluslike curl of steel and glass") and his Spitzer School of Architecture at City College ("crisp and modest and clear") as exemplars of his sleek, modernist aesthetic.

Fred A. Bernstein, writing in The New York Times, noted Viñoly's avoidance of a "signature style" beyond his allegiance to modernism and his "penchant for enclosing large spaces under glass, creating luminous interiors". In another Times article, the architect David Rockwell, who worked with him on several projects, most notably on a proposal for the rebuilding of the World Trade Center, recalled the team's vision of the twin towers reborn as a structure that spiraled defiantly skyward, "a filigreed weave of steel and air [that] would transform the center for trade to one of civics and culture"—a testimonial, Rockwell recalled, to "Rafael's love and belief in the power of beauty and culture."

By contrast, Louis Jebb, writing in The Art Newspaper, focused on Viñoly's refusal to dismiss "nerdy", unglamorous projects as beneath him. "In an era when every 'starchitect' worth the name was chasing glamorous museum commissions, Viñoly was just as happy to be recognized for his work with laboratories, hospitals and universities," wrote Jebb. "The architects he most admired included, historically, Andrea Palladio, and in the modern era Oscar Niemeyer, creator of Brasília, and the minimalist master Mies van der Rohe, whose Seagram Building (completed 1958) was Viñoly's favorite in New York. But the forebear whose buildings appeared to have moved him the most was the Philadelphian magus Louis Kahn":

In a 2021 interview ..., Viñoly spoke about Kahn's celebrated Salk Institute building in La Jolla, California (1962-65), founded by Jonas Salk, the celebrated developer of a successful polio vaccine. First, Viñoly noted, the Salk Institute is a great laboratory—one where ground-breaking research in molecular biology is still done 60 years on. The acid functional test. But, at the end, he said, "it does one thing. You walk [between the two embracing wings] overlooking the ocean. All of a sudden, you feel you are good. You feel somehow that something has touched you that has changed the plane of the experience. Being elevated. It's like late Rembrandt."

Beyond his buildings, Viñoly's legacy in the field, according to the Uruguayan-American architect Amir Kripper, includes paving the way "for architects coming to the U.S. from South America and getting major projects and recognition."

Major works

Major works by Viñoly include 432 Park Avenue in Manhattan, 20 Fenchurch Street in London, the Curve Theatre Leicester, The Bryanston in London and Firstsite art gallery in Colchester, Essex.

Argentina (1968–1979)
 Chamber of Deputies (House of Representatives, or Edificio Anexo de la Cámara de Diputados), Buenos Aires (1966)

Here, in the seat of Argentina's federal government, Viñoly adroitly harmonized a new, modern building (three interconnected blocks containing the representatives' offices, committee meeting rooms, offices for political parties, and a town hall for public meetings) with the existing Chamber of Deputies, on which it sits, and the Congress Building directly across from it, both of which are neoclassical in style. "The highly reflective glass cladding minimizes heat loading on the new construction" and, wittily, "allows it to assume the stylistic qualities of the surrounding buildings", which rather than being upstaged by Viñoly's update "are made more powerful and imposing by their reflected images. The Congress Building in particular thus takes on a heightened presence."

 UIA (Designed 1968; completed 1974)

Designed in 1968 and completed in 1974, the Buenos Aires headquarters of the Argentine Industrial Union ( or UIA), the country's leading advocacy group for industrial manufacturers, helped establish Viñoly as a young architect to watch. According to the monograph Rafael Viñoly, El Edificio Carlos Pellegrini ("the Carlos Pellegrini Building") it marked the architect's "first success in a national design competition". By day, the entry notes, the building's "glass curtain wall...provides staff and visitors spectacular views of the city and the port; at night, it becomes highly transparent, offering equally dramatic views in the opposite direction by revealing the spaces and activities within." The "120-meter-tall pure glass prism" (Rafael Viñoly), which served as UIA's headquarters until 2001, is now regarded as a distinguishing feature of the city's skyline.

 Banco Ciudad de Buenos Aires (1968)

To commemorate its 90th anniversary (more accurately, the anniversary of the bank's nationalization and transferral, in 1888, to the city), the Banco Ciudad de Buenos Aires commissioned a new, more modern headquarters from MSGSSS. Built at breakneck speed by 1000 workers spread over three daily shifts in order to be ready for the building's planned opening in 1968, the project was completed in just six months. Inaugurated on 23 May 1968, the main office of the Banco Ciudad de Buenos Aires employed a traffic-stoppingly innovative design: the extensive use of glass bricks (a modernist trademark) and a glazed panel that gave on pedestrian traffic, signifying institutional transparency as well as accessibility to all Argentinians, regardless of socioeconomic class. The building "quickly gained international recognition", writes R. Stephen Sennott, in the Encyclopedia of Twentieth Century Architecture, "for its transparent use of light and color and for its strong volumetric articulation".

 Rioja Housing Project (1969)

Commissioned in 1969 and completed in 1973, the Rioja Housing Complex was developed by the Bank of the City of Buenos Aires as subsidized housing for 440 employee families. A mixed-use, high-density city within a city occupying 41,000 square meters (456,000 square feet), it incorporates commercial real estate, community spaces, and private residences in seven 18-story units clustered together and linked by 10 bridges to facilitate easy circulation. The design, as the authors of the monograph Rafael Viñoly point out, "combines high density with a layout meant to foster a strong sense of community. An open site allowing pedestrian traffic through most of its footprint creates a large public realm, while the presence of solaria, decks, shops, gardens, and other services throughout the project's multi-level internal circulation scheme encourages interaction among its inhabitants."

Viñoly and the other members of the Estudio de Arquitectura (later, MSGSSS) drew aesthetic as well as functional inspiration from Metabolism, a Japanese movement in architecture and urban planning that took its cues from natural forms and "organic growth patterns" (specifically, "tree imagery") (Rafael Viñoly). The Metabolists advocated for modular design based on "a core construction capable of branching", treelike, "and expanding over time" to create "flexible urban environments" able to keep pace with population growth and the shifting needs of an ever-changing metropolis. In its emphasis on flexible use, interactivity, and the easy circulation of foot traffic (between commercial, residential, and public spaces), the Rioja complex owes a debt to Metabolism.

 CASFPI (Caja de Ayuda y Subsidios Familiares para el Personal de la Industria, "Industrial Workers' Mutual Assistance and Family Subsidies Fund") Headquarters (1974)

Sited in Buenos Aires, this mixed-use headquarters for CASFPI, a union-funded association that provides aid, such as family subsidies, to industrial workers, houses medical services, a restaurant, an auditorium, and the association's offices. The innovative design breaks up the monotonous, oppressive regularity and rectilinearity of most such office towers, notes the Princeton Architectural Press monograph Rafael Viñoly, "by cutting away or pushing back the façade wherever the floor area of the roughly rectangular plan exceeds the programmatic requirements. The glazing of these irregular perforations creates multi-story sculptural objects that provide unexpected views of the city to those within the building, while revealing its internal spatial variety."

 Barrio ALUAR (Aluminio de Argentina) Factory Housing (1974)

Designed to foster community and facilitate circulation via pedestrian zones connecting the development's residences, landscaped plazas, playgrounds, and commercial spaces, the 222,200-foot ALUAR factory housing complex in Puerto Madryn, in the Argentinian province of Chubut, reflects the theoretical emphasis on social engineering that characterized public architecture in Argentina in the late 1960's. Barrio ALUAR provides housing for 750 employees and their families. As Viñoly himself noted, the site presented unique challenges: the harsh conditions of "the windswept Patagonian desert near the Golfo Nuevo in central Argentina" contributes to "extremes of temperature and a steady wind that can reach 120 kilometers per hour," conditions that "inspired an inward-facing array of buildings that turn their backs to the wind to create a sheltered common core". The apartments, which come in a variety of layouts, are clustered in modules; the taller structures shield the modules as well as pedestrian zones. The aesthetics of everyday life are taken into consideration, too: "Each apartment in the complex opens onto an east-facing sheltered terrace with a view of the Atlantic Ocean, less than a kilometer away."

 Mendoza Stadium (1978)

Green-lighted as part of the construction boom in advance of the 1978 World Cup soccer championship, which Argentina had been tapped to host, the Estadio Malvinas Argentinas, in the province of Mendoza, was designed to hold more than 50,000 spectators in a bowl nestled in a natural depression in the foothills of the Andes. "The stadium's shallow, gently sloping bowl, the profile of the Andes, visible from most of the stands, and the unobtrusive security architecture combine to give the spectator a sense of being cradled within the landscape" (Rafael Viñoly). "Unusually, players and spectators are not separated by the high fence typical of contemporary stadia; instead, the field is protected by a low railing and a wide moat," making for less obstructed sightlines.

 ATC (Argentina Televisora Color) (1978)

Argentina's pledge to substantially upgrade its stadia and broadcast facilities played a key role in its winning bid to host the 1978 World Cup soccer championship. Of MSGSSS's World Cup-related projects (which include the Mendoza stadium and the renovation of the Rosario stadium), the 
ATC, the first color TV production center in Argentina, shows off—to dramatic effect—Viñoly's willingness to push the boundaries of the reigning modernist style while remaining sensitive to human use, cultural context, and the natural environment. Harmonizing with its parkland setting, the ATC is equal parts television production center and public plaza, a high-tech nerve center amid playgrounds, a reflecting pool, and an artificial stream (both of which act as "a natural heat exchange for the building's extensive ventilation and air-conditioning systems").

With only 16 months to go before the beginning of the World Cup, the design and construction of the Buenos Aires-based facility took place at a breakneck pace, necessitating what the Princeton Architectural Press monograph Rafael Viñoly calls "a radical amalgam of design and construction", an approach Viñoly would employ with stunning success in decades to come. Nimble, improvisatory, and, it turned out, an unlikely aid to inspiration, this "design/build" philosophy enabled him to adapt on the fly to unexpected developments in the construction process. "In command of a round-the-clock workforce that numbered up to 5,000 individuals" and under punishing time constraints, Viñoly "had no alternative but to pour foundations and begin erecting the building's steel frame with only a general notion of what the final architecture would be like," Rafael Viñoly notes. "As a result, the building is the product of an evolutionary process, a state of flux between design intention and construction reality."

Asked, in a 2008 interview, what his "defining" project was, the architect chose "the Argentina Color Television Center in Buenos Aires. I was in my early thirties and in control of everything. The building process was so unique. We started construction without really knowing what we were doing, and that [teaches] you a great deal." How, the interviewer wondered, "do you start construction without proper working drawings?" "Well, you put the grid on the site and just do it," was Viñoly's reply. "We built the project the way I think all buildings should be made – as a sort of improvisation on a set of working drawings. We just went to the site and said to the contractor: 'Do it from here to there.' We improvised so much, and that is what gave the building its freshness."

United States and abroad (1980–2023)
"By 1978, the Estudio de Arquitectura had designed 116 buildings and completed more than 50 of them, nearly all in Argentina", Suzanne Muchnic writes, in her Los Angeles Times profile of Viñoly. Argentina's hosting of the 1978 FIFA World Cup only two years after a brutal military junta had crushed Argentinian democracy is now regarded as the regime's attempt to legitimize itself, put a friendly face on its authoritarian rule, and whitewash its human-rights atrocities (such as the "disappearance"—abduction, torture, and, more often than not, murder—of thousands of Argentinians who opposed the junta). The organizing committee that commissioned Viñoly's design of the Mendoza stadium answered to the military dictatorship.

"Despite his success, Viñoly found himself working in an increasingly authoritative and oppressive society", writes Muchnic. "When he went home one day and discovered that his personal library had been searched and that some of his books in foreign languages had been deemed suspicious, he decided to leave the country". He landed a position as a visiting professor of architecture at Harvard University School of Design and, in 1979, moved his family to New York. Without a license to practice architecture in the States, he made ends meet by working as a developer and teaching architecture at various universities. "His first break", according to Muchnic, "was at the City University of New York's John Jay College of Criminal Justice".

 John Jay College of Criminal Justice, New York City (1986–88)

Hired to "convert a historic high school building into a research library" (Muchnic) at the City University of New York's John Jay College of Criminal Justice, Viñoly ended up designing a substantially expanded version of the original project, which evolved to include a theater, swimming pool, gymnasium, indoor track, and tennis courts.

As the monograph Rafael Viñoly notes, he had to serve two masters: "the college's need for a new and bigger building and the legal mandate to preserve a designated landmark, the Flemish Baroque exterior" of Haaren Hall, formerly the 1906 DeWitt Clinton High School, designed by Charles B. J. Snyder. "The new construction, both within and beyond the previous building envelope, acknowledges the rhythms and proportions of the original façade while effecting a transition" to Viñoly's "modern architectural vocabulary... The renovation inserted a sky-lit interior plaza within the high school's cast-iron columns and load-bearing masonry walls; around its perimeter is the college library, which includes one of the largest criminal justice collections in the United States".
  
Embracing the central atrium on two levels, the library is the building's conceptual anchor. "Upon entering the building, visitors are literally surrounded by the criminal justice library", notes the architect's website, "and can access all building functions directly from this day-lit space, which diffuses light throughout the rest of the College".
 
The first phase of a Herculean project whose master plan encompassed an entire block in Manhattan, The College of Criminal Justice was built in an astonishing 24 months on a fast-track schedule. It became an exemplar of the firm's approach: standing firm on design principles while collaborating with a project's stakeholders to arrive at ingenious, often highly innovative design solutions such as the central day-lit atrium, which won recognition from the Municipal Art Society and the City Club with two awards 1988 and 1989.

 Lehman College, APEX (Athletics and Physical Education Facility), Lehman College, The Bronx, New York City (1987–94)

"The point of this building appears to be the classical belief that the human form lies at the root of the idea of beauty," wrote Herbert Muschamp in his 1 May 1994 New York Times column on Viñoly's swooping, soaring P.E. facility for CUNY's Lehman College. The architect "employs no caryatids or Ionic orders to render this ancient concept," Muschamp observed. "Rather, he integrates engineering and esthetics into one impeccably toned physique."

Mr. Viñoly's design brings to mind the pivotal moment when Greek sculptors mastered the art of depicting the figure in motion. The esthetic apex of this Apex is the roof: a blocklong, aerodynamic arc of steel that rises gently over the campus treetops. ... While it contains no overtly symbolic forms, the entire building displays athletic poise under gravity's pressure. ... [T]hin clerestories...run the length of the roof, emphasizing gradual shifts in the trajectory of its curve, and by slight elevations in the roof line that define the building's entrance. The trusses convert lines of force into a delicate lattice. The subtext of the building, to borrow Kenneth Clark's terms, is the transformation of the merely naked into the nobly nude.

Comprising two basketball courts, a running track, an Olympic-size competition swimming pool, racquetball courts, dance studios, locker rooms, classrooms, and offices, Viñoly's 142,000-square-foot P.E. facility at Lehman College welcomes the college's community via a lobby framed by a cutout in the roof even as it beckons the surrounding community across its threshold on Bedford Park Boulevard, at the northern edge of the Lehman campus, by means of an "open plaza, aligned with the main campus walkway, [that] slips through the building, dividing it into wings and connecting the street entrance to the college's inner quadrangle" (Muschamp).

The traffic-stopping roof is a segmented, outward-bulging curve reminiscent in its dynamism of Eero Saarinen's gull-winged TWA Terminal; seen from the right angle, it looks airborne. Swooping nearly to ground level on the campus side and supported, on the street-facing side, by a concrete-and-glass section containing classrooms and administrative offices, the APEX's aerodynamic roof is sheathed in mill-finished stainless steel cladding. When the light is right, it assumes the color of the sky, performing an architectural vanishing act.

On the building's campus-facing side, the roof "ends just feet off the ground, over a row of clerestory windows for the underground gyms inside", writes David Bady, in an essay published on the Lehman College website. "The effect of the tilt is to put nearly the whole roof on view at once, so that it appears uncannily out of scale, like a work of nature, a tsunami wave or mountain ridge." Viñoly has described the building's profile as "more like geography than architecture". Visitors entering from the Bedford Park side pass "through the shadow beneath a suspended corridor and [emerge] onto an apron between descending hillsides of steel and glass," writes Bady. "There [they're] met by the vista down Lehman's main axis, thick with trees and bordered by Gothic towers. It's more than just a striking visual effect. ...Viñoly seems to be using architecture to represent the Bronx gaining access, by means of its civic institutions, to an ideal world."

 Tokyo International Forum, Tokyo, Japan (1989–96)

Erected where the old City Hall once stood, on an immense (6.7-acre) site in the Yūrakuchō business district, the Tokyo International Forum is "a prime venue for global events and cultural exchange", the architect's website informs; a sprawling multipurpose "civic complex that accommodates dance, musical, and theatrical performances, conventions and trade shows, business meetings, and receptions".

Organized by the Tokyo Metropolitan Government under the auspices of the Union lnternationale des Architectes, the international competition to design the Forum opened in 1989. Applicants had their work cut out for them: bounded on the east by the curving viaduct of the famous "Bullet Train" and on the west by the moat and outer gardens of the Imperial Palace, the awkwardly shaped site defied cookie-cutter solutions. The facility's intended role as a nerve center of cultural life and commercial activity, not to mention a transportation hub—four subway lines and two of the city's busiest train stations, Tokyo Station and Yūrakuchō Station, lie just to the north and south of the site—presented design challenges of their own.

Rafael Viñoly Architects' ingenious solutions to these problems won a unanimous vote from the international jury, which selected the firm's proposal out of the nearly 400 anonymous entries submitted by architects from over 50 countries.

Adjusting the curve of the site's eastern boundary to transform it into a perfect arc, Viñoly created two concentric arcs hugging the railroad viaduct; within them, he slipped the slender, scythe-shaped building that houses the complex's meeting rooms. The "lenticular shape between the two intersecting arcs becomes the complex's vast lobby," notes the monograph Rafael Viñoly. "Another narrow slab building along the western boundary of the site, this time perfectly linear, contains the administrative offices." Four cube-shaped volumes, marching from the site's northern boundary to its southern edge, contain the facility's three largest performance spaces, "all raised above grade in order to free up the center of the site for a large public plaza" thronged by more than 100,000 people every day. Over the two-block-long, granite-paved plaza looms the spectacular seven-story Glass Hall.

"As you approach, the Forum divides itself into two structures joined by a public plaza," wrote the New York Times architectural critic Herbert Muschamp, Viñoly's unswerving champion (and most keenly insightful observer).

The Glass Hall rises on one side, tapering to a blade-sharp corner at both ends. On the other side, the Forum's four main meeting halls occupy a graduated row of gray concrete cubes. The plaza is actually more like a two-block-long pedestrian promenade. Beautifully landscaped and furnished with seating, the plaza is meant to be an oasis for office workers in the financial district nearby. The visual effect of this outdoor space is of a man-made ravine, a portage between rippling glass reflections and a cliff of faceted gray stone.

The Hall is a marvel of engineering whose 197-foot-high curtain wall of laminated glass would seem to tempt fate in an island nation whose collective memory is haunted by catastrophic earthquakes. Not so: though "extremely light and flexible", the Glass Hall's structural system is designed to withstand "extreme seismic forces" (Rafael Viñoly).

The roof of this giant atrium...is supported by an innovative truss system of arched beams in compression and cable elements in tension. The resulting monumental trellis both filters light into the space below and defines the building's presence on the Tokyo skyline. Audaciously, its 25,000-ton weight is transferred onto just two columns, which are located on the centerline of the Hall's longitudinal axis[,]...185 meters apart. These two columns, just over a meter in diameter at base and capital, replace the perimeter columns that would ordinarily have carried the weight of the walls and the roof, and thus make possible the exceptional transparency of the Glass Hall's exterior, glazed with 25,000 square meters of glass. The walls of the atrium support themselves with a very light steel compression system consisting primarily of the mullions needed to mount the individual nine-meter-square glass panes. To counteract the vertical deflection caused by wind loads on the walls' vast surface area, an additional system of pretensioned cables was attached to this frame. Horizontal deflection by the same forces is held in check, at the top of the volume by the shape of the roof, and below by mid-air pedestrian bridges, which span the atrium and function as beams.

The Hall is operatic in its visual drama. Muschamp was rhapsodic: "By day a glittering crystal, at night a glowing lantern, the Forum's Glass Hall joins the ranks of the world's great spaces. Like some lighter-than-air vessel, the hall's shipshape roofing slices through the Tokyo cityscape." Viñoly took up the theme in a 1998 lecture ("The Tokyo International Forum: The Making of Public Space"), observing that "the dramatic lighting of the truss has achieved what we never set out to do: the roof is becoming a horizontal landmark in the city. Landmarks are normally conceived as endless vertical structures up to the sky. In contrast, this hovers over Tokyo. It can be seen from many places and it is quite wonderful."

Fascinatingly, the inspiration for Viñoly's bold design came from the Pan Am logo. At wit's end because he "couldn't come up with any good idea" that would ensure his was the winning proposal, he "went to Paris to take a break on a Pan Am flight," he recalled, in an interview. "And when they started serving dinner, I saw this logotype on my napkin, which were these ellipses inscribed in a circle. What was incredibly difficult at that time is that I couldn't understand how to reconcile the curving of the rail tracks and a very rigid geometry of the octagonal streets adjacent to the site. So when I saw that logo everything just fell into place so perfectly. ... I landed in Paris and took the plane back to finish the project"—and secure the jury's unanimous approval.

Viñoly regards the Tokyo International Forum as a sea change for himself and his studio. "This commission ignited Rafael Viñoly Architects' growth in this period," the company website asserts. RVA "quickly became an international firm of 150 architects with projects throughout the United States and in Japan, South Korea, and Latin America."

 Bronx County Hall of Justice (1994–2006)

Located at East 161st Street, on a two-block site near the borough's Grand Concourse Boulevard, the Bronx County Hall of Justice is home to 47 courtrooms, seven grand jury rooms, and a large jury assembly room for the Supreme and Criminal Court; administrative offices for the Bronx District Attorney; and facilities for the New York Police Department, the Department of Corrections, and the Department of Probation.

In designing the large, complex facility, Viñoly had to reconcile the security demands of an urban threat environment transformed, after construction had begun, by the 1995 Oklahoma City bombing and 9/11; the energy-efficiency requirements of a greener architecture; and his desire to create a structure whose public courtyard, in the words of his firm's website, embraces "neighboring communities with an open and engaging civic plaza". "We really wanted to render a building that was open, unlike the building next door which was a fortress", Viñoly told The Architect's Newspaper (which identified the building in question as "the Brutalist former Criminal Court building"). "This building is exactly the opposite, with openness and access".

Even so, security trumped all, in the building's conception. "While natural light and views were desirable, heightened security requirements demanded protective design", notes the RVA website. According to an article on the Lehman College website, "Bullet-resistant glazing is used in the lobbies and judges' areas. In high security areas, glass is fitted with a ceramic frit to prevent direct viewing from the surrounding buildings. The public plaza, loading dock, and mail room structures are all blast resistant". 
  
Nevertheless, the architect's website contends, "The Hall of Justice expresses the judicial system's openness and transparency" through its translucent curtain wall, whose fritted glass "allows daylight to permeate deep within the building" yet "screens the private circulation corridors. The accordion-fold design includes 'light shelves' that reflect daylight and reduce heat and glare. Diffused glazing renders interiors effectively opaque from the outside while providing exterior views from within". The design pays environmental dividends, too: Viñoly's highly effective exploitation of daylighting maximizes the Hall's energy efficiency.

"These buildings have traditionally been like fortresses", Fred Wilmers, project director for Rafael Viñoly Architects, told The New York Times. "We look to change that perception. The transparency is sort of figurative, but there is some in the literal sense as well". A later article, also in the Times, observed, "The modern South Bronx courthouse, meant to summon feelings of transparency and openness, could be seen as an attempt to refute Tom Wolfe's famous depiction of the Bronx courts as dens of urban dysfunction".

 Princeton University Stadium (Powers Field) (1995–1998)

Replacing Princeton's dilapidated Palmer Memorial Stadium, Viñoly's horseshoe-shaped "multi-sport and education facility" transformed the underside of the stadium seating—"a dark and unattractive area", notes the architect's website, "cluttered with stadium service elements"—into a covered public space. Brightened by natural light and beautified with extensive plantings, it "can be enjoyed independently from the sports events".

As always, Herbert Muschamp, the New York Times architecture critic, was applausive. "The park spills through the arches into the stadium itself," he wrote in his 21 June 1998 review. "Two raised plazas, set into the corners, are planted with trees. Walkways, bordered on one side with sloping planting beds, pass through the stadium, beneath the upper bleachers; these remain accessible even when the stadium is closed. Sunlight passes through slits between the rows of seats, casting bold stripes of brightness and shade, though the paths may prove more popular when it's raining."

But he wasn't all effusiveness. "The palette is on the raw side," he lamented. "The aggregate is not a pretty color. The bleachers are bare concrete, with strips of aluminum stretched along the seats. ... [Viñoly] has a weakness for dull walls." Then again, "it's a relief that Vinoly doesn't try to make these walls interesting. Their uncompromising intelligence is clear enough. Yet you may find yourself wishing that the visual matched the philosophical appeal."

 Van Andel Institute (Phases 1 and 2, 1997–2009)

Like the Princeton stadium, the visually arresting Van Andel Institute for cancer research in Grand Rapids, Michigan makes ample use of natural light to create psychologically appealing interior spaces that prioritize the human use of buildings while reaping significant rewards in energy efficiency. Yet it's also traffic-stoppingly stunning, its terraced levels cascading down the steeply sloping site, the "fritted, arched glass skylights" of its "double-height interior atria" evoking "the rapids of the nearby Grand River."
 
Ahead of its time in its attention to architecture's carbon footprint and environmental impact, Viñoly's design is ingenious in its use of energy-saving technologies. "Sunlit labs mean less need for electric lighting, and 13,000 square feet of photovoltaic panels make up much of the difference," notes Giulia Guzzini in the design and architecture magazine Domus. "Waterless urinals and a ... 'green roof' reduce water consumption and runoff; the building itself was constructed in large part from materials ... manufactured locally [or] from recycled materials. Even the site—in a dense urban area, on a former brownfield site, with little disruption to the surrounding natural habitat—adds to [Rafael Viñoly Architects'] green credentials."

 Kimmel Center for the Performing Arts (1997–2001)

Occupying a full block in Center City Philadelphia, the Kimmel Center is a commanding presence on the Avenue of the Arts (Broad Street). Its "block-long barrel vault of glass and steel" (RVA website) embraces the 2,500-seat Verizon Hall, home to the Philadelphia Orchestra; the Perelman Theater, a more intimate, reconfigurable recital hall; and Commonwealth Plaza, an immense public space.

The Kimmel Cultural Campus, as the buildings and public space are collectively known, was initially conceived as a new home for the city's orchestra. The orchestra's home at the time, the Academy of Music (1857), was a jewel box of a building, cherished by symphony audiences for its ornate 19th-century interior. Its dismal acoustics, on the other hand, were the bane of musicians and audiences alike.

The Viñoly team's reconception of the concert hall, with assistance from the acoustician Russell Johnson of Artec Consultants, was nothing short of radical:

RVA decided not to treat Verizon Hall as just another architectural element, designed according to the principles of a given architectural style, but instead to conceive of it as a musical instrument, designed in accordance with the principles of ideal sound production. ... To that end, the interior is shaped like a cello, entirely clad in mahogany with no orthogonal surfaces, and with the orchestra, the source of the sound, located within the plan in a position analogous to that of a cello's bridge, which connects the strings to the sounding body of the instrument.

The natural acoustic properties of this shape and spatial arrangement are supplemented by a series of passive and active devices deployed throughout the hall. The majority of the interior walls are actually operable doors that allow the sound to flow into enormous reverberation chambers that occupy the interstitial space between the exterior enclosure and the interior of the concert hall. Depending on the doors' configuration, reverberation times inside the hall can be lengthened by increasing the overall volume as much as 30 percent. This programmable system is augmented by retractable sound absorbing curtains within the reverberation chambers and a configurable acoustic canopy that directs sound energy out to the audience while allowing the musicians to hear themselves clearly.

The design of the 650-seat Perelman Theater, whose turntable stage enables the theater to shapeshift from the traditional proscenium-arch configuration into a smaller, arena-style space with a concert shell and wraparound seating, is equally innovative.

But the real stunner is the complex's glass barrel vault. "Its structure of folded steel ribs sheathed in plate glass renders an incredibly transparent enclosure with a free span of approximately 50 meters," according to the monograph Rafael Viñoly (Princeton Architectural Press, 2002). "The end walls of the barrel vault achieve such a high level of transparency and structural lightness that they seem to disappear as sunlight pours into the plaza. A gravity-tensioned cable suspension system supports over 1,000 square meters of optically clear museum glass at each end of the barrel vault. Specifically designed as a curtain, as opposed to a mesh with cables crossing in two directions, the walls' structure is nearly invisible but can still withstand gale force wind pressures by deflecting—like a membrane—approximately one meter in or out at the center of its surface. Slightly tinted Low E glass [mitigates] the structure's heat gain and [acts] as a UV shield to preserve the color and quality of the natural macore wood that sheaths the Verizon Hall.

The project struck a responsive chord in Viñoly, whose father was a screenwriter and filmmaker whose creative vision was deeply rooted in his passion for theater and music. "The first orchestra I ever knew was The Philadelphia Orchestra, under Leopold Stokowski, which I heard on my father's records," the architect told an interviewer. "He was involved professionally with music in Uruguay and then in Argentina, where he ran the Teatro Colón, and I myself originally trained for a career as a pianist. So it appealed to me to build a place for The Philadephia Orchestra, for which I retain an adulation that dates back to childhood."

 David L. Lawrence Convention Center (1999–2003)

Overlooking the Allegheny River in downtown Pittsburgh, Pennsylvania, the 1.4 million-square-foot David L. Lawrence Convention Center marries Viñoly's commitment to green architecture—RVA's use of natural ventilation, gray water reclamation, native landscaping (eliminating the need for irrigation), low-temperature air distribution, and daylighting (which illuminates 75% of the building) earned the Center Platinum LEED (Leadership in Energy and Environmental Design) certification—to a cresting, wavelike suspension-cable roof that pays homage to Pittsburgh's historical sense of itself both as a "City of Bridges" and a Promethean "Steel City," powered by industrial innovation and manufacturing might.

The design "draws structural inspiration from the bridges that span Pittsburgh's Allegheny River to create a suspended roof with a rising contour that encourages passive ventilation and shelters a vast, column-free space," the RVA site informs. "This unique steel cable structure made possible a naturally-lit, column-free 250,000-square-foot exhibition hall." In 2004, the Institution of Structural Engineers awarded Viñoly's David L. Lawrence Convention Center its Supreme Award for Structural Engineering Excellence.

An evolveEA study detailed in the Journal of Green Building concluded that the success of the David L. Lawrence Convention Center "proved that sustainability principles could be integrated into a breathtaking and high-performing design". Using nearly a decade's worth of performance data, the study yielded persuasive evidence that "green building projects can accelerate broader organizational sustainability efforts" and "create major benefits for a region, including additional commerce and an increased uptake of green building design".

 Princeton University, Carl Icahn Laboratory, Lewis-Sigler Institute for Integrative Genomics (LSI) (1999–2004)

Driven, according to its website, by "the need to deal with the explosion of information based on the genomic sequences of the human and all major experimental organisms" and founded on the assumption that "the most interesting and difficult problems in the quantitative disciplines...frequently lie in biological phenomena," The Lewis-Sigler Institute of Integrative Genomics's research and teaching programs draw on an academic brain trust whose expertise spans physics, chemistry, computer science, chemical engineering, and molecular biology.

Rafael Viñoly Architects' design for the LSI facilitates collaboration across disciplines or, as the monograph Rafael Viñoly (Princeton Architectural Press, 2002) puts it, "multiplying opportunities for intellectual cross-pollination": the "loft-like" laboratories are equipped with modular partitions and demountable casework (cabinetry, bookshelves, and the like), the firm's website notes, "for maximum flexibility over time as research needs change to keep up with the pace of genomic science". The atrium "at the heart of the building" is "a social place where researchers and students can meet in formal and informal conference areas, sparking the impromptu discussions that lead to collaboration and new research paths". At the same time, the design remains true to Viñoly's environmentally conscious (and cost-efficient, because energy efficient) ethos and, not least, his signature use of natural light and his sense of structure as sculpture: the atrium "looks onto a large, ellipse-shaped campus green through a curved, two-story glass curtain wall that introduces natural light deep into the center of the building. In order to minimize thermal loading on the mechanical systems, a series of 31 12-meter-tall, computer-controlled aluminum louvers track the movement of the sun to provide optimal shading to the south-facing curtain wall at all times, creating a dynamic interplay of light and shadow in the atrium throughout the day."

 University of Chicago Booth School of Business, Charles M. Harper Center (2000–2004)

In visual conversation with its neighbors—Frank Lloyd Wright's iconic Robie House, an exemplar of his Prairie Style, and the university's Rockefeller Chapel, a Gothic masterpiece—Viñoly's Booth School of Business is anchored by a central winter garden, a glass atrium that soars six stories up, culminating in a roof supported by curved steel beams (a nod to the chapel's Gothic arches) and crowned by four "four-pointed vaults built of tubular steel with proportions that follow those of the Rockefeller Chapel's lancet windows." Divided into two orders, the building's perimeter features a lower element "clad in horizontal panels of the same Indiana limestone that is widely used on other campus structures" and whose earth-hugging horizontal composition echoes that of the Robie House.

"Two extremes of American attitude towards architecture are neighboring the Booth School of Business, the Robie house and the collegiate Gothic chapel and the tower," says Viñoly, in a video interview created for the university. "The greatest difficulty is to try to reconcile these two from an architectural point of view."

Taking the structural principle of the Gothic architecture and bringing it back into this reinterpretation seemed to me to be quite legitimate. What you see in the central space is this reference to the Gothic arch. I essentially took it as the best way of supporting a large span of glass, which was the whole intent of the central space. We thought that it was important to create a sense of an internal quad, so one is the summer garden and the other one is the winter garden. ... [T]hese two elements ... are the kinds of things that give a sense of collective purpose.

 The Bryanston, Marble Arch Place, Hyde Park, London (2020)
The Bryanston, Hyde Park, London is architect Rafael Viñoly's first luxury residential building in the UK.
The Bryanston by developer Almacantar together with the project's architect, Rafael Viñoly, is the tallest residential address to overlook Hyde Park. Generosity of space and embracing green living were key influencers in Viñoly's design. 
Viñoly's design for The Bryanston has an inherent emphasis on enhancing residents' wellness. Three metre floor-to-ceiling heights and curved full-height windows offer protected southerly vistas across Hyde Park, creating a sense of space and inviting natural light in.
Rafael Viñoly, Principal Architect at Rafael Viñoly Architects said: In my opinion, the British are the best landscape designers in the world, so Hyde Park was completely dominant in the design of The Bryanston. It is totally unique in its position overlooking the park, the park itself is extraordinary and the best views anyone can have are from The Bryanston's apartments, which is quite the claim for its owners.
The Bryanston couldn't be found anywhere else in the world, it captures the character of this iconic corner of London with an intimacy that draws you in and encourages you to look out across the sweeping horizon.

Criticism

Carbuncle Cup
20 Fenchurch Street in London won the 2015 Carbuncle Cup for its ugliness.

Sun glare

Two of the skyscrapers designed by Viñoly, the Vdara in Las Vegas and 20 Fenchurch Street in London, have experienced sun reflectivity problems as a result of their concave curved glass exteriors, which act, respectively, as cylindrical and spherical reflectors.  In 2010, the Las Vegas Review-Journal reported that sunlight reflecting off the Vdara's south-facing tower could make swimmers in the hotel pool uncomfortably warm and had been known to melt plastic cups and shopping bags; employees of the hotel referred to the phenomenon as the "Vdara death ray". In London, sunlight reflecting off 20 Fenchurch Street during the summer of 2013 melted parts on a parked Jaguar and scorched the carpet of a nearby barber shop.

432 Park Ave
432 Park Ave is currently embroiled in lawsuits and complaints regarding flooding, electrical problems, and excess building sway.

Quotations

 "Today we are all under the pervasive influence of fantastic image-making. There is a lot of vanity associated with architecture in this setting, and this is something about which I feel very dubious. There is much confusion about this question of the autonomy of architecture as an artistic practice. Aesthetics and self-expression in architecture are not as important as the fact that it is a social act. There is an enormous social responsibility in what architects do. It is important to push beyond the obvious in order to make something more than what is required. ... [M]echanisms must be sought which ensure the proposal can be enriched and transformed into something which has cultural meaning and which contributes to the sense of permanence and the betterment of the city."
 "If you want to see great architecture, you must go to Fort Worth to see [Louis Kahn's] Kimbell Art Museum. We all have seen it. We have pictures of it. We know it through models and everything, but when you come into this place, the experience has nothing to do with what you see. It is about what you feel, and that is what makes great architecture – the subtleties."

Honors and awards
Design Honor, Salvadori Center, 2007
International Fellow, The Royal Institute of British Architects, 2006
National Design Award Finalist, Cooper-Hewitt National Design Museum, 2004
Neutra Medal for Professional Excellence: In recognition for his contributions to the Environmental Design Profession and in honor of Modernist architect Richard Neutra, 2000.
Honorary Doctorate, University of Maryland, 1997
Medal of Honor, American Institute of Architects, New York City Chapter, 1995
National Academician, The National Academy of Design, 1994
Fellow, American Institute of Architects, 1993
Konex Award, Konex Foundation, Argentina, 1992

References
Notes

Bibliography
Hilary Lewis and Roman Viñoly, THINK New York: Ground Zero Diary 
Rafael Viñoly, The Making of Public Space: 1997 John Dinkeloo Memorial Lecture

External links

Rafael Viñoly Architects PC

1944 births
2023 deaths
20th-century American architects
Argentine architects
Rafael Viñoly buildings
Uruguayan architects
University of Buenos Aires alumni
Uruguayan emigrants to the United States
Harvard University staff
People from Montevideo
Academicians
Deaths from aneurysm